Generations College, formerly MacCormac College, is a private two-year college in Chicago, Illinois. The college is accredited by the Higher Learning Commission and approved by the National Court Reporters Association and American Bar Association. It is located in downtown Chicago at 29 East Madison Street, on the second floor of the historic Heyworth Building.

History
Generations College was founded in 1904 by Morton C. MacCormac and his wife, Mary MacCormac, in Hyde Park on Chicago's south side near the University of Chicago. MacCormac served as the school's first president for 50 years. The school established the first court reporting program in the United States in 1912 
 and the first paralegal studies program in Illinois in 1973.

Accreditation
Generations College is accredited by the Higher Learning Commission.

References

External links
Official website

Universities and colleges in Chicago
1904 establishments in Illinois
Educational institutions established in 1904
Private universities and colleges in Illinois
Two-year colleges in the United States